Eduardo Jonatão Samuel "Dinho" Chingunji (son of Kafundanga Chingunji) (born 7 September 1964) served as a political leader in UNITA, a pro-Western rebel group in Angola. During Angola's civil war (1975–2002), all of Chingunji's brothers died in mysterious circumstances, except for him. Rumors attributed their deaths to assassination plots ordered by UNITA leader Jonas Savimbi.

Angolan troops killed Savimbi in 2002, bringing the civil war to an end. UNITA held its ninth Congress in Viana, Angola from June 24 to 27, 2003. Chingunji, Isaías Samakuva, and Paulo Lukamba contested UNITA's presidency at the Congress. Chingunji overwhelmingly lost to Samakuva, receiving only 20 votes to Samakuva's 1,067 votes and Gato's 277.

See also
2000s in Angola

References

1964 births
Living people
People of the Angolan Civil War
Angolan rebels
Angolan warlords
UNITA politicians
20th-century Angolan people
21st-century Angolan people
Angolan revolutionaries